Phytoecia sareptana is a species of beetle in the family Cerambycidae. It was described by Ganglbauer in 1888. It is known from China and Russian Far East.

References

Phytoecia
Beetles described in 1888